The Hispano-Suiza 14AA, also known as Type 79,  was a fourteen-cylinder aircraft radial engine used in France during the late 1930s. As Hispano-Suiza lacked recent experience in developing radial engines, it was derived from the licensed Wright R-2600 engine. Due to reliability problems, the engine was largely supplanted by the similar Gnome-Rhône 14N.

Not to be confused with the smaller Hispano-Suiza 14AB, which was derived from the smaller Wright Whirlwind series.

Variants
14AA-00
 Direct drive LH rotation
14AA-01
 Direct drive RH rotation as -00
14AA-02
 0.625:1 reduction gear LH rotation
14AA-03
 0.625:1 reduction gear RH rotation as -02
14AA-04
 0.625:1 reduction gear LH rotation
14AA-05
 0.625:1 reduction gear RH rotation as -04
14AA-06
 Direct drive LH rotation
14AA-07
 Direct drive RH rotation as -06

Applications
Amiot 341
LeO 45
Farman F.223
Latécoère 530
Latécoère 570
Koolhoven F.K.58
 Potez 501
 Romano R.120

Specifications (14AA-04)

See also

References

Aircraft air-cooled radial piston engines
1930s aircraft piston engines
Hispano-Suiza aircraft engines